Collision was an American heavy metal band from New York City that formed in 1979.  Playing in relative obscurity for nearly 13 years, they were signed by Chaos/Columbia after they heard one of the band's demos.  The band then released their first full-length album entitled Collision in 1992.  In 1995, they released their second and last full-length album, Coarse, with Sony Music Distributing.

Members
 Nik Chinboukas (vocals/guitar)
 Gustavo J. Vitureira (bass) 
 Alex Kyriazis (drums)

Discography

Studio albums
 Collision (1992)
 Coarse (1995)

External links
 Collision at Allmusic.com

Musical groups established in 1979
American musical trios
Heavy metal musical groups from New York (state)